The Mainland Premier League is a league competition run by Mainland Football for association football clubs located in the northern half of the South Island, New Zealand. It is currently regarded by the New Zealand footballing community as the strongest football league in the South Island of New Zealand and features current and former New Zealand Football Championship players. 

The competition currently runs between March and August each year, and consists of seven teams based in Christchurch, and one team in Nelson. There are 21 rounds where teams play each other three times. The winner of the league qualifies for the South Island Championship, a one-off game against the winner of the FootballSouth Premier League, which is hosted by the two federations in alternate years.

By statute, the winners of the Canterbury Championship League and Nelson Bays Division One play in a home and away play-off, with the winner of the tie receiving promotion to the Premier League. However, due to potential extra travel costs, the winner of the Nelson Bays Division One title usually forgoes the right to a play-off. This effectively means that the winner of the Canterbury Championship League title is normally promoted to the Premier League.

In 2012, Woolston Technical and Cashmere Wanderers merged to become Cashmere Technical; they replaced the Woolston side that had finished sixth in the 2011 competition. Recently merged teams Coastal Spirit (Established between New Brighton AFC and Rangers AFC in 2008), and FC Twenty 11 (Established between Avon United and Burnside AFC in 2011) entered the Premier League through promotion from the Division One competition.

Mainland Premier League clubs
As of 2023 season.

(2) — Denotes club's second team

Winners

1998 - Christchurch United
1999 - Halswell United
2000 - Halswell United
2001 - Halswell United
2002 - Ferrymead Bays
2003 - Nomads United
2004 - Nelson Suburbs
2005 - Nelson Suburbs
2006 - Ferrymead Bays
2007 - Nomads United
2008 - Nelson Suburbs
2009 - Woolston Technical
2010 - Woolston Technical
2011 - Ferrymead Bays
2012 - Ferrymead Bays
2013 - Cashmere Technical
2014 - Cashmere Technical
2015 - Cashmere Technical
2016 - Cashmere Technical
2017 - Ferrymead Bays
2018 - Cashmere Technical
2019 - Cashmere Technical
2020 - Cashmere Technical
2021 - Cashmere Technical
2022 - FC Twenty 11

Mainland Premier Football League Winners

Cashmere Technical's MPL titles in 2009 and 2010 were won by Woolston Technical, which was later merged in 2012.

References

External links
 Mainland Premier Football League Table
 

2
Sports leagues established in 1998
1998 establishments in New Zealand